Canada has participated eleven times in the Summer Paralympic Games and in all Winter Paralympic Games. They first competed at the Summer Games in 1968 and the Winter Games in 1976.

Milestones
At the 2000 Summer Paralympics, Stephanie Dixon sets the Canadian record for most gold medals at a single Paralympics, Winter or Summer, with 5.

At the 2002 Winter Paralympics, Canada set a new total Canadian gold medal record haul at a Winter Paralympics, with 6.

At the 2004 Summer Paralympics, Chantal Petitclerc & Benoit Huot ties the 5 gold medal record at a single Games. Petitclerc also won the demonstration sport of Wheelchair Racing in the 2004 Summer Olympics.

At the 2008 Summer Paralympics, Chantal Petitclerc again ties the 5 gold medal record at a single Games.

In 2010, Brian McKeever of Canada became the first athlete in the world to be named to the Winter Paralympics and Winter Olympics teams in the same year. At the 2010 Winter Olympics, he was scheduled to compete in the men's 50 km cross-country race.

At the 2010 Winter Paralympics, Viviane Forest became the first para-athlete to win a gold in both the Winter and Summer Games, by winning the Women's Downhill for Visually Impaired. She had previously won gold in the 2000 and 2004 Summer Paralympics for women's goalball.

Lauren Woolstencroft became the first Canadian to win 3 golds at the same Winter Paralympics, at the 2010 edition, this was eventually upped to 5 golds. With her 4th gold medal, she helped Canada set a record for most gold medals at any Winter Paralympic Games by winning the 7th medal. The previous mark was six, set at the 2002 Salt Lake City Paralympics. With her 5th gold medal, she set the record for most gold medals won by any Winter Paralympian at a single Games, and she tied the record for gold medal haul of any Canadian Paralympian at a single Games, tying Chantal Petitclerc (who did the feat twice), Stephanie Dixon and Benoit Huot both Summer Paralympians. Her five gold are also the record for any Canadian Winter Paralympian or Olympian.

At the 2010 Games, Canada collected the most total medals and the most gold medals of any Winter Paralympics, up through 2010 for Canada, with 19 total medals, and 10 golds.

At the 2018 Winter Paralympics cross country skier Brian McKeever became Canada's most decorated Winter Paralympian when he won a 14th medal in five Games from 2002 to 2018, passing the late Lana Spreeman, who won 13 medals in para-alpine skiing between 1980 and 1994.

Hosting the Games
Canada has hosted the Games twice.

In 1976, and in 2010, Canada also hosted the Olympic Games counterpart, the 1976 Summer Olympics and the 2010 Winter Olympics respectively. Canada did not host the Paralympic Games counterpart to the 1988 Winter Olympics in Calgary, Alberta; this was the last Winter Olympics that the host city did not also host the Winter Paralympics. The 1988 Summer Paralympics was the first Paralympics to be linked to the hosting of the Summer Olympics. The 1976 Summer Olympics were hosted in Montreal, and not linked to the Toronto Paralympiad.

Medals
The ranking in these table is based on information provided by the International Paralympic Committee (IPC) and is consistent with IPC convention in its published medal tables, ordered first of all by the number of gold medals the athletes from a nation have won, followed by the number of silver medals and then the number of bronze medals.

Medal tables

Red border color indicates host nation status.

Medals by Summer Games

Medals by Winter Games

Medals by summer sport
Medals by sport

Medals by winter sport
Medals by sport

Best results in non-medaling sports:

Records

Summer Paralympics

Multi medalists
This is a list of Canadian athletes who have won at least three gold medals or five medals at the Summer Paralympics. Bold athletes are athletes who are still in active.

Multi golds at single Games
This is a list of Canadian athletes who have won at least two gold medals in a single Games. Ordered categorically by gold medals earned, sports then year.

Multi medals at single event
This is a list of Canadian athletes who have won at least three medals in a single event at the Summer Paralympics. Ordered categorically by medals earned, sports then gold medals earned.

Most appearances
This is a list of Canadian athletes who have competed in four or more Summer Paralympics. Active athletes are in bold. Athletes who were aged under 15 years of age and over 40 years of age are in bold.

Winter Paralympics

Multi-medalists
This is a list of Canadian athletes who have won at least two gold medals or three medals at the Winter Paralympics. Athletes in bold are still active.

Multi golds at one game
This is a list of Canadian athletes who have won at least two gold medals at a single Winter Paralympics. Order by gold medals earned, sport then year.

Multi medals at one game
This is a list of Canadian athletes who have won at least three medals in a single event at the Winter Paralympics. Order by medals earned, sport then year.

Most appearances
This is a list of Canadian athletes who have competed in at least four Winter Paralympics. Still active athletes are in bold.

See also

 Canadian Paralympic Committee
 Canada at the Olympics
 Canada at the Commonwealth Games
 Canada at the Pan American Games

References